A semi-automatic pistol is a type of handgun which utilizes the energy of the fired cartridge to cycle the action of the weapon and advance the next available cartridge into position for firing. One round is fired each time the trigger of a semi-automatic pistol is pulled.

See also

References
Citations

Bibliography
 World Guns
Terry Gander Guns Recognition Guide, May 2005, 
David Miller Illustrated Directory of 20th Century Guns , June 2003, 
Richard D. Jones Jane's Gun Recognition Guide'' June 2008, 

Pistols